The Slovak ambassador in Washington, D. C. is the official representative of the Government in Bratislava to the Government of the United States.

List of representatives 

Slovakia–United States relations

References 

 
United States
Slovakia